Doug Reynolds is the name of

 Doug Reynolds (footballer) (born 1933), Australian rules footballer
 Doug Reynolds (athlete) (born 1975), American discus thrower
 Doug Reynolds (politician) (born 1976), West Virginia politician